is a Japanese football player. He plays for Verspah Oita.

Club statistics

References

External links

1989 births
Living people
People from Nagakute, Aichi
Association football people from Aichi Prefecture
Japanese footballers
J1 League players
J2 League players
Japan Football League players
Nagoya Grampus players
Tokushima Vortis players
Verspah Oita players
Association football midfielders